Larreule may refer to:
Larreule, Pyrénées-Atlantiques, a French commune in the Aquitaine region
Larreule, Hautes-Pyrénées, a French commune in the Midi-Pérénées region